Contour Aviation (legally Corporate Flight Management, Inc. d.b.a. Contour Aviation) is a multifaceted aviation services company based in Smyrna, Tennessee, USA. It started operations in 1982 as an on-demand charter service for passengers and freight in the southern United States, as well as a full-service Federal Aviation Administration certificated repair station and a fixed-base operator. Contour maintains its corporate office at the Smyrna Airport.  It currently operates charter flights, provides aircraft management, sales, government services, and maintenance, repair and overhaul (MRO) services. 

Contour Aviation is the parent company of Contour Airlines, which provides scheduled domestic service as a regional airline.

Fleet
The Contour Aviation charter fleet (FAR Part 135) includes the following aircraft:

Leadership 
Matt Chaifetz:
Chief Executive Officer

Kelly Ginn:
Executive Vice President of Finance

Lee Harris:
Executive Vice President of Flight Operations

Bill Maguire:
Vice President of Information Technology

Dan Feemster:
Vice President of Government Services

Joe Sayles:
Vice President of Maintenance Operations

Sybilla Slavin:
Vice President of Charter Sales & Management

Matt Ostermann:
Vice President of Fixed Base Operations

References

Airlines based in Tennessee
Smyrna, Tennessee
Transportation in Rutherford County, Tennessee
Airlines established in 1982
Charter airlines of the United States